This is a List of people from Lahijan, Gilan province, Iran who have been born in, raised in, lived in or who died in Lahijan, Gilan, Iran. Individuals are listed by field in which they are best known:

Scientists 
Mohammad Ali Mojtahedi Gilani - Founder of Sharif University of Technology and Director of Alborz High School.

Poets and writers
Bijan Najdi - Poet and Writer
Hazin Lahiji - Iranian Poet and Scholar
Abd al-Razzaq Lahiji

Sportspeople 
Farshid Karimi, football player

Politicians 
Hassan Zia-Zarifi - Iranian intellectual and one of the founders of the communist guerrilla movement in Iran
Reza Qotbi - Head of Iranian National TV

Artists 
Ghasem Hajizadeh, pioneering painter in Iranian Pop art
Ardeshir Mohassess, painter and cartoonist
Parviz Sayyad, one of the leading Iranian actors in 1960's

Religion 
Sheikh Zahed Gilani - Grandmaster of the famed Zahediyeh Sufi Order at Lahijan

References

External links

Lahijan